Hard law refers to actual binding legal instruments and laws. In contrast with soft law, hard law gives States and international actors actual binding responsibilities as well as rights. The term is common in international law where there are no sovereign governing bodies.

Hard law means binding laws. To constitute law, a rule, instrument or decision must be authoritative and prescriptive. In international law, hard law includes self-executing treaties or international agreements, as well as customary laws. These instruments result in legally enforceable commitments for countries (states) and other international subjects.

Sources of international hard law:
Treaties (also known as conventions or international agreements)
United Nations Security Council Resolutions
Customary International Law

Philosophy of law
Law by type